Hey You, Hey You!, Hey, You, Hey, You!, or variants may refer to:

Music

Albums
 Hey, You (EP), an EP by the Japanese post-rock band Mono
 Hey You, a 1999 album by Jack Ingram
 Hey You: The Essential Collection 1988–1990, a 1998 compilation album by Youssou N'Dour

Songs
 "Hey You!", single by Black Lace
 "Hey You!" by No Doubt
 "Hey You" (311 song)
 "Hey You" (Bachman–Turner Overdrive song)
 "Hey You" (Madonna song)
 "Hey You" (Pink Floyd song)
 "Hey You" (The Quireboys song)
 "Hey You", by A1 from Here We Come
 "Hey You", by Aaron Carter from Oh Aaron
 "Hey You", by Big Mello from Done Deal
 "Hey You", by Blaze Ya Dead Homie from Colton Grundy: The Undying
 "Hey You!", by Bomb the Bass from Into the Dragon
 "Hey You", by Boys Like Girls from Crazy World
 "Hey You", by Chris Rea from Water Sign
 "Hey You", by The Clarks from Another Happy Ending
 "Hey You", by CNBLUE from Ear Fun
 "Hey You", by The Connells from Ring
 "Hey You", by Cool for August from Grand World
 "Hey You!!!", by The Cure from Kiss Me, Kiss Me, Kiss Me
 "Hey You", by Day of Fire from Losing All
 "Hey You", by Dinosaur Pile-Up from Growing Pains
 "Hey You!", by Divine from Maid in England
 "Hey You", by Dr. Sin from Brutal
 "Hey You", by The Exies from Head for the Door
 "Hey You", by Faster Pussycat from The Power and the Glory Hole
 "Hey You", by Floetry from Floetic
 "Hey You", by Foolish Things from Let's Not Forget the Story
 "Hey You", by Godhead from The Shadow Line
 "Hey You", by Gordon Lightfoot from Dream Street Rose
 "Hey You", by Heart from Red Velvet Car
 "Hey You", by Jamie Scott and the Town from Park Bench Theories
 "Hey You", by Johnny Winter from Let Me In
 "Hey You", by Jun-ho of 2PM
 "Hey You", by Kim Appleby from the self-titled album
 "Hey You!", by Kim Wilde from Come Out and Play
 "Hey You", by Lea Michele from Places
 "Hey You", by The Lurkers from Fulham Fallout
 "Hey You", by Malcolm Middleton from Sleight of Heart
 "Hey You", by Miranda Cosgrove from Sparks Fly
 "Hey You", by Modern Talking from Ready for Romance
 "Hey You!", by No Doubt from Tragic Kingdom
 "Hey You", by Opshop from You Are Here
 "Hey You", by Oz from Heavy Metal Heroes
 "Hey, You", by Paula Seling from Culeg Vise
 "Hey You", by The Pharcyde from Labcabincalifornia
 "Hey You", by Phunk Junkeez from The 96' Lost Tapes
 "Hey You", by The Pointer Sisters from Contact
 "Hey You", by Pony Pony Run Run from You Need Pony Pony Run Run
 "Hey You", by Scorpions from Animal Magnetism
 "Hey You", by Scatman John from Scatman's World
 "Hey You", by Shakira from Oral Fixation, Vol. 2
 "Hey You", by Silkk the Shocker from Based on a True Story
 "Hey You", by Sims from Bad Time Zoo
 "Hey You", by Sistar from Give It to Me
 "Hey You", by Smooth from You Been Played
 "Hey You", by Stereo Fuse
 "Hey You", by Styles of Beyond featuring Mike Shinoda from Reseda Beach
 "Hey You", by Thin Lizzy from Chinatown
 "Hey You", by Tokio Hotel from Humanoid
 "Hey You", by Tommy Stinson from Village Gorilla Head
 "Hey You", by Ultrabeat from The Weekend Has Landed
 "Hey You (Batch of Lies)", a 1998 song by Black Label Society from Sonic Brew
 "Hey You (Looking at the Moon)", a 1974 song by Graham Nash from Wild Tales
 "Eh, Tú" (Spanish for "Hey, You"), a song by El Canto del Loco from Personas
 "Hei, tu!" (Romanian for "Hey, You!"), a song by Iris
 "Hey du" (German for "Hey You"), a 2009 song by Sido from Aggro Berlin
 "望塵莫及" (Chinese for "Hey You"), a 2008 song by Stanley Huang from We All Lay Down in the End
 "Hey U" a 2006 song by Basement Jaxx from Crazy Itch Radio

Television and films
 Hey You! (TV series), a 1967 Australian television comedy series
Hey You (film), a 2022 Nigerian romantic comedy

See also
 Hey Ya (disambiguation)
 "Hey You! Get Off My Mountain", a 1973 single by The Dramatics
 "(Hey You) The Rock Steady Crew", a 1983 UK top 10 hit single by Rock Steady Crew